The Steele Creek Roadhouse is a historic roadhouse, post office, and trading post in east-central Alaska. It is located on the south side of the Fortymile River, at the mouth of Steele Creek, and is accessible via a hiking trail from mile 105 of the Taylor Highway, or by river access. Its first story was built c. 1898 by a man named Anderson, with the second story added in about 1910. It was on the main route between Eagle and Chicken between 1907 and 1951, serving travelers and local residents, until the Taylor Highway bypassed it. It underwent restoration in 2011.

The building was listed on the National Register of Historic Places in 1980.

See also
National Register of Historic Places listings in Southeast Fairbanks Census Area, Alaska

References

Hotel buildings on the National Register of Historic Places in Alaska
Commercial buildings completed in 1898
Buildings and structures in Southeast Fairbanks Census Area, Alaska
Buildings and structures on the National Register of Historic Places in Southeast Fairbanks Census Area, Alaska
Hotels established in 1898
1898 establishments in Alaska
Post office buildings in Alaska